WNPX-TV (channel 28) is a television station licensed to Franklin, Tennessee, United States, broadcasting the Ion Television network to the Nashville area. It is owned and operated by the Ion Media subsidiary of the E. W. Scripps Company alongside CBS affiliate WTVF (channel 5). WNPX-TV's transmitter is located near Cross Plains, Tennessee.

WNPX also serves as the de facto Ion outlet for the Bowling Green, Kentucky media market, as that area does not have an Ion station of its own.

History

As an independent station
The station was signed on by Dove Broadcasting on January 23, 1989, as WMTT, an independent station serving Cookeville. On March 17, 1989, it was sold to Steven J. Sweeney. The station would sign on with a general-entertainment format featuring cartoons, sitcoms, movies, religious programming, and infomercials. InaVision Broadcasting purchased WMTT in 1993, and changed its call sign to WKZX that year.

As a WB affiliate
WKZX became a charter affiliate of The WB in 1995, and would later share the WB affiliation with WNAB (channel 58), which also served Nashville and was signed on two months later. The network also aired on cable via the superstation feed of Chicago-based WGN-TV, later branded WGN America. In 1995, WKZX launched a nightly newscast at 6:30 pm (and repeated at 10:00 p.m.) branded as News 28. In 1997, InaVision Broadcasting sold the station to Roberts Broadcasting, a company based in St. Louis.

As a Pax/Ion O&O
In 1998, Roberts Broadcasting sold WKZX to Paxson Communications, who shut down the station's news operation. Paxson also moved and upgraded WKZX's transmitter to begin focusing the channel on the Nashville market. The station's call sign was changed to WNPX-TV. On August 31, the station ended its affiliation with The WB and began airing programming from the then-new upstart television network Pax TV, the forerunner of Ion Television.

The WB would continue airing on WNAB along with the cable superstation feed of WGN. However, a year later, on January 27, 1999, network co-owners Time Warner and Tribune mutually agreed that as of September, they would cease the stopgap WB programming relay over the WGN superstation feed. Affiliation agreements were signed with local broadcast stations within the top-100 media markets after its launch, whereas coverage for the 110 smallest markets was only achieved through the September 1998 launch of The WeB (renamed The WB 100+ Station Group). Cable providers were offered a pre-packaged feed of WB network and syndicated programs. As a result, WNAB became the sole WB affiliate in the Nashville market.

Near-sale to Fox; move to Franklin
On August 2, 2017, it was reported that Fox Television Stations was in discussion with Ion Media to create a joint-venture that would merge the two respective stations. The partnership was said to include plans to shift affiliations from Sinclair Broadcast Group stations in favor of Ion-owned stations for those whose affiliation agreements were soon to expire. In Nashville's case, this included shifting Fox from WZTV (channel 17) to WNPX-TV. If WZTV lost its Fox affiliation, the station would become independent again, as it was from 1968 to 1971 (as WMCV) and 1976 to 1990. This partnership was reported on May 8, 2017, when Sinclair announced that they would acquire Tribune Media for $3.9 billion.

Fox was concerned by this deal, as Sinclair was viewed as a competitor in conservative-leaning news. Through the deal, Sinclair gained increased leverage to air Fox programming on reverse compensation. This deal came as Fox's affiliation agreement contract with Sinclair was about to expire. However, on December 6, 2017, it was reported that Sinclair and Fox were discussing a deal that would see its Fox affiliates renew their affiliation agreement in exchange for Sinclair selling some of its Fox affiliates directly to Fox Television Stations. As a result of the deal, between six and ten Fox affiliates owned by Sinclair and Tribune (all in markets with an NFL team) would become Fox owned-and-operated stations. It was unknown whether WZTV would be one of the stations sold, although the stations being sold to Fox were expected to be from Tribune Media (notably KCPQ in Seattle, where Sinclair already owned KOMO-TV), many of which were previously owned by Fox. The chances that WZTV would keep its Fox affiliation increased in October 2017 when Ion determined its stations would have a must-carry status instead of retransmission consent, which the Federal Communications Commission (FCC) ruled Ion must keep for three years. However, must-carry only applies to a main signal, allowing Fox to possibly affiliate with a digital subchannel on WNPX-TV and other Ion stations. On May 9, 2018, Sinclair announced that seven Fox affiliates would be sold to FTS. WZTV was not included in these and an affiliation renewal was announced for it instead, a move that would keep WZTV with Sinclair. This meant that WNPX-TV would also remain an Ion owned-and-operated station.

Sometime in 2019, WNPX's city of license was changed from Cookeville to Franklin.

Sale to Scripps
On September 24, 2020, the Cincinnati-based E. W. Scripps Company announced that it would purchase Ion Media for $2.65 billion with financing from Berkshire Hathaway. With this purchase, Scripps divested 23 Ion-owned stations, but no announcement was made at the time as to which stations would be divested as part of the move. The proposed divestitures allowed the merged company to fully comply with the FCC local and national ownership regulations. Scripps agreed to a transaction with an unnamed buyer, who has agreed to maintain Ion affiliations for the stations. (The buyer was revealed in an October 2020 FCC filing to be Inyo Broadcast Holdings). It was also stated that Scripps decided to keep WNPX-TV, making it a sister station to CBS affiliate WTVF (channel 5), pending approval by the FCC. The transaction was finalized and closed on January 7, 2021.

It was later announced on January 14, 2021, that E. W. Scripps Company would cease operations of Qubo, Ion Plus and Ion Shop on February 28, 2021, as it was reported that they would move their Katz Broadcasting networks (which include Bounce TV, Court TV, Ion Mystery, Grit and Laff) to the former Ion Media owned-and-operated stations, but will still retain Ion as their main affiliation. On February 27 at 5 a.m., the station transitioned the second, third and fourth subchannels, with Court TV replacing Qubo on channel 28.2, Grit replacing Ion Plus on channel 28.3, and Laff replacing Ion Shop on 28.4. Laff continued to air on sister station WTVF channel 5.3, but was replaced with Bounce TV on September 1. WKRN-TV would replace Bounce TV with SportsGrid on channel 2.2 and Grit with Rewind TV on channel 2.4 at the same time. WSMV-TV currently still continues to air Court TV Mystery on 4.2 and Court TV on 4.4.

On March 2, the E. W. Scripps Company announced plans to add two new networks to its digital broadcast portfolio (joining its six existing networks). Defy and TrueReal (the latter had initially been billed as Doozy), which will respectively target men and women in the 25-54 age range with factual lifestyle and reality programming, was announced to launch on several E. W. Scripps owned-and-operated stations. There was previous speculation that the two new networks would launch on WNPX, replacing both HSN and QVC on the fifth and sixth subchannels, as this was officially confirmed on June 22, 2021. On June 30, 2021, WNPX-TV replaced both QVC and HSN with previews of both Defy TV and TrueReal, previewing the programming to launch on both networks. Both networks officially launched on July 1, 2021. The station launched an eighth subchannel to return HSN to the area in May 2022; QVC followed suit on a ninth subchannel in August.

Technical information

Subchannels
The station's digital signal is multiplexed:

Analog-to-digital conversion
WNPX-TV terminated its analog signal over UHF channel 28 on June 12, 2009, the official date on which full-power television stations in the United States were federally mandated to transition from analog to digital broadcasts. The station's digital signal remained on its pre-transition UHF channel 36. Through the use of PSIP, digital television receivers display the station's virtual channel as its former UHF analog channel 28.

Spectrum incentive auction results 
In the summer of 2017, as a result of its participation in the FCC's 2016–17 incentive auction, WNPX filed for a construction permit for its digital signal to relocate to UHF channel 32. On October 18, 2019, WNPX moved to channel 32 due to spectrum repacking. CBS affiliate WTVF moved its digital signal allocation to WNPX's former allocation.

Former translator
Until 2015, the station also utilized an analog translator, WNPX-LP on channel 20, located at Whites Creek. The translator was sold to Daystar on March 26, 2015.

References

External links

NPX-TV
Ion Television affiliates
Court TV affiliates
Grit (TV network) affiliates
Laff (TV network) affiliates
Defy TV affiliates
TrueReal affiliates
Scripps News affiliates
E. W. Scripps Company television stations
Television channels and stations established in 1989
1989 establishments in Tennessee
Mass media in Williamson County, Tennessee